Jacqueline Arenstein (born 6 June 1921) was a South African anti-apartheid activist. A member of the South African Communist Party (SACP) from the age of 21, she was a defendant in the 1956 Treason Trial and repeatedly banned from the 1960s through to the 1980s. In 1984 she was appointed as a legal adviser to Mangosuthu Buthelezi.

Life 
Arenstein is Jewish, and is a cousin to the former Minister of Intelligence Services Ronnie Kasrils.

References

1921 births
Possibly living people
Jewish South African anti-apartheid activists
Members of the South African Communist Party
White South African anti-apartheid activists